Delhi Institute of Pharmaceutical Sciences and Research (DIPSAR) is an institution located in New Delhi, India. It is providing teaching and research in pharmaceutical sciences. It is affiliated with Delhi Pharmaceutical Science and Research University (DPSRU).

History
The institute was founded in 1964 as Department of Pharmacy of Delhi Polytechnic (later renamed Delhi College of Engineering, now Delhi Technological University) and was located in Kashmiri gate, Delhi. In 1972, it was converted into the College of Pharmacy and moved to the campus of the Pusa Institute. Finally,  in 1979 it moved to its present campus in Pushp Vihar. In 2004 it was named as Delhi Institute of Pharmaceutical Sciences & Research, affiliated to University of Delhi. Following the establishment of Delhi Pharmaceutical Science and Research University (DPSRU) it was made a constituent college of DPSRU, which operates from the same building.

Ranking

It was ranked 22 by the  National Institutional Ranking Framework (NIRF) pharmacy ranking of 2022.

Courses offered
 D.Pharma
 B.Pharma
 M.Pharma - Pharmacology, Pharmaceutics, Hospital Pharmacy, Quality Assurance, Clinical Research, Pharmaceutical Chemistry, Herbal Drug Technology, Pharmaceutical Management
MBA - Pharmaceutical Management
 Ph.D.
 BPT
 Bachelors in sports science
 Bachelors of business administration [BBA] Healthcare

Departments
 Clinical research
 herbal
 Hospital pharmacy
 Pharmaceutical chemistry
 Pharmaceutical management
 Pharmaceutical sciences
 Pharmaceutics
 Pharmcognosy
 Pharmacology

See also
Jamia Hamdard
National Institute of Pharmaceutical Education and Research, S.A.S. Nagar
National Institute of Pharmaceutical Education and Research, Raebareli
Birla Institute of Technology and Science, Pilani
Birla Institute of Technology, Mesra
Pharmacy College Saifai
Uttar Pradesh University of Medical Sciences
Panjab University

References

External links 
 

Research institutes in Delhi
Pharmaceutical research institutes
Pharmacy education in India
Educational institutions established in 1964
1964 establishments in Delhi